Coelostegia is a genus of flowering plants belonging to the family Malvaceae.

Its native range is Western Malesia.

Species:

Coelostegia borneensis 
Coelostegia chartacea 
Coelostegia griffithii 
Coelostegia kostermansii 
Coelostegia montana 
Coelostegia neesiocarpa

References

Malvaceae
Malvaceae genera